Frozen vegetables are vegetables that have had their temperature reduced and maintained to below their freezing point for the purpose of storage and transportation (often for far longer than their natural shelf life would permit) until they are ready to be eaten. They may be commercially packaged or frozen at home. A wide range of frozen vegetables are sold in supermarkets.

Examples of frozen vegetables which can be found in supermarkets include spinach, broccoli, cauliflower, peas, corn, yam (in Asia) either packaged as a single ingredient or as mixtures. There are occasions when frozen vegetables are mixed with other food types, such as pasta or cheese. Frozen fruits are produced using a very similar approach.

Some popular brands include Birds Eye, Sunbulah and Green Giant, as well as supermarkets' 'store brand' items.

Frozen vegetables have some advantages over fresh ones, in that they are available when the fresh counterpart is out-of-season, they have a very long shelf life when kept in a freezer and that they often have been processed a step or more closer to eating (usually washed and cut, sometimes also seasoned). In many cases, they may be more economical to purchase than their fresh counterparts or are packaged while ripe.  The fruit used for frozen fruit is overripe.  Some use the terminology "spoiled" or "seconds".  

The history of frozen fruits can date back to the Liao Dynasty of China, with the "frozen" pear being a classic delicacy eaten by the Khitan tribes in the Northeastern region of China. Modern frozen vegetables with the flash freezing technique was popularized by Clarence Birdseye in 1929.

Health benefits and risks
In general, boiling vegetables can cause them to lose vitamins. Thus, the process of blanching does have deleterious effects on some nutrients. In particular, vitamin C and folic acid are susceptible to loss during the commercial process. In addition, studies have shown that thawing frozen vegetables before cooking can accelerate the loss of vitamin C.

Over the years, there has been controversy as to whether frozen vegetables are better or worse than fresh ones. Generally, reports show that frozen vegetables are as nutritionally beneficial when compared to fresh ones.

A 1997 study performed by the University of Illinois, 2007 study performed by University of California - Davis and a 2003 Austrian study support that canned or frozen produce has no substantial nutritional difference not attributable to the presence of added salt, syrup or other flavouring, and in fact suggest that canned or frozen produce is nutritionally superior because of the very rapid deterioration of nutrients in fresh produce. 

An advantage that frozen vegetables have over canned is that many brands contain little or no added salt because the freezing process by itself is able to stop bacterial growth. However, many canned vegetable brands with little or no sodium have become available and many frozen brands do have salt added for more flavour.

Frozen vegetables can be contaminated with certain pathogens like Listeria. It is recommended they are cooked before consumption to avoid potential illness.

See also
Frozen food
Canned food
Cold chain

References

External links
How Frozen Vegetables are Made

Food preservation
Convenience foods
Frozen food
Vegetables